The Journalists' Union of the Athens Daily Newspapers  (Ε.Σ.Η.Ε.Α.) is a Greek trade union for journalists employed in the daily newspapers and broadcast media in news outlets based in Athens.

It was founded in 1914 in Athens as the Journalists' Union. It adopted its current name in 1947.

It has a membership of 2,110 and is a member of the Panhellenic Federation of Journalists' Unions, the European Federation of Journalists and the International Federation of Journalists.

See also

Trade unions in Greece

External links
 Website

International Federation of Journalists
Trade unions in Greece
Trade unions established in 1914
Journalists' trade unions
Greek journalism organizations